Padillothorax is a genus of southeastern Asian jumping spiders first described by Eugène Simon in 1901.  it contains only two species.

Taxonomy
First described by Eugène Simon in 1901, Padillothorax was synonymized with Stagetillus by Jerzy Prószyński in 1987. Stagetillus was placed in the tribe Baviini, part of the Salticoida clade of the subfamily Salticinae by Wayne Maddison in 2015, on the basis of molecular phylogenetic evidence, although only a single unidentified species of Stagetillus from Selangor was included in the analysis. In 2017, Prószyński recognized the genus again, but did not include the type species, Padillothorax semiostrinus, so his action was not valid under the International Code of Zoological Nomenclature. He included this species in 2018, thus successfully reviving the genus. He also transferred a species included in Padillothorax by Reimoser in 1927 to a new genus Padillothorus, leaving two species in Padillothorax.

Species
, the World Spider Catalog accepted the following species:
Padillothorax badut Maddison, 2020 – Malaysia (Borneo)
Padillothorax casteti (Simon, 1900) – India
Padillothorax exilis (Cao & Li, 2016) – China
Padillothorax flavopunctus (Kanesharatnam & Benjamin, 2018) – Sri Lanka
Padillothorax mulu Maddison, 2020 – Malaysia (Borneo)
Padillothorax semiostrinus Simon, 1901 (type species) – Malaysia (peninsula), Singapore, Taiwan?
Padillothorax taprobanicus Simon, 1902 – Sri Lanka

References

Salticidae genera
Salticidae